Hypovoria hilaris is a species of tachinid flies in the genus Hypovoria of the family Tachinidae.

Distribution
Central Asia, Denmark, Cyprus, Greece, Italy, Portugal, Spain, Turkey, France, Iran, Israel, Palestine, Mongolia, Canary Islands, Egypt, Morocco, Tunisia, Russia, Armenia, Azerbaijan, China.

References

Dexiinae
Insects described in 1856
Diptera of Europe
Diptera of North America
Diptera of Asia
Diptera of Africa
Taxa named by Joseph Villeneuve de Janti